Boiling Springs High School (BSHS) is a small, rural, public high school in the historic town of Boiling Springs, Pennsylvania. It is part of the South Middleton School District. Boiling Springs High School is the sole high school operated by the district. In the 2016–2017 school year, enrollment was reported as 684 pupils in 9th through 12th grades.

Boiling Springs High School students in 10th, 11th, or 12th grades may choose to attend Cumberland-Perry Area Vocational Technical School for training in the construction and mechanical trades; landscaping fields, computer systems; cosmetology; criminal justice and dental assisting fields. Students earned credits towards graduation, as well as industry certifications and college credits in some classes. The Capital Area Intermediate Unit IU15 provides the district with a wide variety of services like specialized education for disabled students and hearing, speech and visual disability services and professional development for staff and faculty.

The school's colors are purple and gold. Their name and mascot is based on a famous bubbling spring that is the source of a nearby lake.

Extracurriculars
Boiling Springs High School offers a variety of activities, clubs and an extensive athletics program to students. Varsity and junior varsity athletic activities are under the Pennsylvania Interscholastic Athletic Association.

BSHS's football team consistently makes it to the playoffs. Most notably in 2005, the Bubblers went 10-0 only to lose to Littlestown, Pennsylvania, in the first round of the PIAA playoffs in a classic game. They are also known for their wrestling team who had many finalists in the state tournament.

Sports
Boiling Springs High School competes in sporting events using the mascot and name "Bubblers".

The district funds:

Boys
Baseball - AAA
Basketball - AAA
Cross country - AA
Football - AAAA
Golf - AA
Soccer - AAA
Swimming and diving - AA
Track and field - AAA
Wrestling - AA

Girls
Basketball - AAA
Cross country - AA
Field hockey - AA
Soccer (fall) - AA
Softball - AAA
Swimming and diving - AA
Track and field - AA
Volleyball - AA

According to PIAA directory July 2014

References

External links

Schools in Cumberland County, Pennsylvania
Public high schools in Pennsylvania
Susquehanna Valley